In telecommunications, a carrier wave, carrier signal, or just carrier, is a waveform (usually sinusoidal) that is modulated (modified) with an information-bearing signal for the purpose of conveying information. This carrier wave usually has a much higher frequency than the input signal does. The purpose of the carrier is usually either to transmit the information through space as an electromagnetic wave (as in radio communication), or to allow several carriers at different frequencies to share a common physical transmission medium by frequency division multiplexing (as in a cable television system). The term originated in radio communication, where the carrier wave creates the waves which carry the information (modulation) through the air from the transmitter to the receiver. The term is also used for an unmodulated emission in the absence of any modulating signal.

In music production, carrier signals can be controlled by a modulating signal to change the sound property of an audio recording and add a sense of depth and movement.

Overview

The term carrier wave originated with radio. In a radio communication system, such as radio or television broadcasting, information is transmitted across space by radio waves. At the sending end, the information, in the form of a modulation signal, is applied to an electronic device called a transmitter. In the transmitter, an electronic oscillator generates a sinusoidal alternating current of radio frequency; this is the carrier wave. The information signal is used to modulate the carrier wave, altering some aspects of the carrier, to impress the information on the wave. The alternating current is amplified and applied to the transmitter's antenna, radiating radio waves that carry the information to the receiver's location. At the receiver, the radio waves strike the receiver's antenna, inducing a tiny oscillating current in it, which is applied to the receiver. In the receiver, the modulation signal is extracted from the modulated carrier wave, a process called demodulation.

Most radio systems in the 20th century used frequency modulation (FM) or amplitude modulation (AM) to add information to the carrier. The frequency spectrum of a modulated AM or FM signal from a radio transmitter is shown above. It consists of a strong component (C) at the carrier frequency  with the modulation contained in narrow sidebands (SB) above and below the carrier frequency. The frequency of a radio or television station is considered to be the carrier frequency. However the carrier itself is not useful in transmitting the information, so the energy in the carrier component is a waste of transmitter power. Therefore, in many modern modulation methods, the carrier is not transmitted. For example, in single-sideband modulation (SSB), the carrier is suppressed (and in some forms of SSB, eliminated). The carrier must be reintroduced at the receiver by a beat frequency oscillator (BFO).

Carriers are also widely used to transmit multiple information channels through a single cable or other communication medium using the technique of frequency division multiplexing (FDM). For example, in a cable television system, hundreds of television channels are distributed to consumers through a single coaxial cable, by modulating each television channel on a carrier wave of a different frequency, then sending all the carriers through the cable. At the receiver, the individual channels can be separated by bandpass filters using tuned circuits so the television channel desired can be displayed. A similar technique called wavelength division multiplexing is used to transmit multiple channels of data through an optical fiber by modulating them on separate light carriers; light beams of different wavelengths.

Carrierless modulation systems 

The information in a modulated radio signal is contained in the sidebands while the power in the carrier frequency component does not transmit information itself, so newer forms of radio communication (such as spread spectrum and ultra-wideband), and OFDM which is widely used in Wi-Fi networks, digital television, and digital audio broadcasting (DAB) do not use a conventional sinusoidal carrier wave.

Carrier leakage 

Carrier leakage is interference caused by cross-talk or a DC offset. It is present as an unmodulated sine wave within the signal's bandwidth, whose amplitude is independent of the signal's amplitude. See frequency mixers.

See also 
 Carrier recovery
 Carrier system
 Carrier tone
 Frequency-division multiplexing
 Sideband

References

Communication circuits
Waveforms